Alex Q. Askew is an American politician who served one term as a Democratic member of the Virginia House of Delegates, starting January 8, 2020. He was narrowly defeated in his bid for re-election by Republican Karen Greenhalgh.

Biography
Askew was born and raised in Virginia Beach, Virginia. He attended Tallwood High School and graduated from Hampton University. During his career, he worked for a number of political campaigns at all levels, including the presidential campaigns of Barack Obama in 2012 and Bernie Sanders in 2016.

Askew remains active in his community, and is involved in several programs including New Jerusalem Ministries, where he serves as a mentor and tutor to the local youth.

Political career

Askew ran for the 90th district in the 2014 special election, but lost in the Democratic primary to Joe Lindsey.

Askew ran for the 85th district in 2019 to succeed delegate Cheryl Turpin, who was resigning to run for the 7th district of the Virginia Senate. He won the general election against Republican Rocky Holcomb with 51.6% of the vote.

In an upset, Askew was narrowly defeated by cabinet store owner Karen Greenhalgh. Due to the narrow margin of victory, a recount was conducted in early December. The recount reaffirmed Greenhalgh's victory with 115 votes. Askew conceded shortly thereafter.
Askew is running to return to the House of Delegates to represent the 95th district in 2023.

References

Living people
Politicians from Virginia Beach, Virginia
Hampton University alumni
Democratic Party members of the Virginia House of Delegates
21st-century American politicians
1985 births
African-American state legislators in Virginia
Candidates in the 2014 United States elections
21st-century African-American politicians
20th-century African-American people